Pigeon gait is a form of gait abnormality.

Presentation
Torsional abnormalities.
 Hip dysplasia

References

Gait abnormalities